Nalini by Day, Nancy by Night is a 2005 documentary film by filmmaker Sonali Gulati.

This film explores business process outsourcing in India. Told from the perspective of an Indian living in the United States, the film provides a glimpse into India's call centers, 
where telemarketers acquire American names and accents to service the telephone-support industry of the U.S. The film incorporates animation as a way to build in personal narrative in a doodle-like manner. It also includes live action footage which takes the form of cinema verité and innovatively edited interviews, and archival footage that provides contextual analysis to the socio-political history of globalization and capitalism. The film is a commentary on identity in the new millennium that intersects diaspora with global outsourcing. It was first shown at the 2005 Margaret Mead Film Festival.

Awards

Director's Choice Award, Black Maria Film & Video Festival 2006 
2nd Prize NextFrame Film Festival 
1st Prize International Short Film, 24th International Cinemateca Film Festival, Uruguay
Ledo Matteoli Award for Best Immigrant Story, 39th Annual Humboldt International Film Festival
Winner, 16th Annual Rosebud Film & Video Festival

See also
Bombay Calling

References

External links
Official website
 

2005 films
English-language Indian films
Documentary films about globalization
2005 short documentary films
Documentary films about India
Outsourcing in India
2000s business films
2000s English-language films